Papilio pitmani is a species of swallowtail butterfly from the genus Papilio that is found in Burma, Thailand and Vietnam.

Subspecies
Papilio pitmani pitmani
Papilio duboisi Vitalis de Salvaza, 1921 (central Vietnam)

Taxonomy
Papilio pitmani is a member of the fuscus species-group. The members of this clade are
 Papilio albinus Wallace, 1865
 Papilio diophantus Grose-Smith, 1883
 Papilio fuscus Goeze, 1779
 Papilio hipponous C. & R. Felder, 1862
 Papilio jordani Fruhstorfer, 1906
 Papilio pitmani Elwes & de Nicéville, [1887]
 Papilio prexaspes C. & R. Felder, 1865
 Papilio sakontala Hewitson, 1864

References

External links
The Global Butterfly Information System Images of specimens deposited in the Natural History Museum, London Includes images of Papilio pitmani subspecies leptopsephus Fruhstorfer, 1909

pitmani
Butterflies of Indochina
Insects of Myanmar
Lepidoptera of Thailand
Insects of Vietnam
Butterflies described in 1887
Taxa named by Lionel de Nicéville